Rafiq Zakaria (5 April 1920 – 9 July 2005) was an Indian politician and Islamic religious cleric. He was closely associated with the Indian independence movement and Indian National Congress party. He was known for his advocacy of traditional Islam.

Early life and education
Zakaria, a Konkani Muslim from Maharashtra, was an alumnus of Ismail Yusuf College, Mumbai. He won the Chancellor's Gold Medal in the MA examination of University of Mumbai and in 1948 received a PhD from the School of Oriental and African Studies, University of London. His doctoral thesis was titled Muslims in India: a political analysis (from 1885–1906). He was called to the bar from Lincoln's Inn in England.

Career
Zakaria practised law in Mumbai, where he was appointed Chief Public Prosecutor. He spent over 25 years in public service, including some time as a cabinet minister in state government of Maharashtra and later as a Member of the Indian parliament. He served as deputy to Indira Gandhi, the leader of the Congress Party, in the Lok Sabha. Zakaria represented India abroad, including at the United Nations in 1965, 1990 and 1996.

He was Chancellor of the Jamia Urdu, Aligarh (Uttar Pradesh), and President of Maharashtra College in Mumbai.

Aurangabad
Zakaria contested the first election of the newly created Maharashtra state in 1962, from Aurangabad, and was elected to Maharashtra assembly. He was made Minister for Urban Development in the new ministry. It was under his guidance that planning for New Aurangabad was initiated. The responsibility for the new city was given to CIDCO which started development in the 1970s.

He founded a number of schools and colleges in his constituency. These included a women's college of arts and sciences and the Indian Institute of Hotel Management, which is now known as the Institute of Hotel Management, Aurangabad (IHM-A). The Maulana Azad Education Trust Aurangabad operates multiple educational institutions.

Works
His many books include A Study of Nehru (ed.), The Struggle Within Islam, Muhammed and the Quran, The Price of Partition, and Communal Rage in Secular India.

Zakaria mostly wrote on Indian affairs, Islam and British imperialism. His works include:

A Study of Nehru
The Man Who Divided India
Razia: Queen of India
The Widening Divide
Discovery of God
Muhammad and the Quran
Rise of Muslims in Indian Politics
The Struggle Within Islam
Conflict Between Religion and Politics
Iqbal, the Poet and the Politician (1993)
The Price of Partition
Gandhi and the Break-up of India
Indian Muslims: Where Have They Gone Wrong?
Sardar Patel and Indian Muslims
Communal Rage in Secular India (On the aftermath of the Godhra Riots)
The Trial of Benazir (1989)
He had earlier worked for the News Chronicle and The Observer in London, United Kingdom. Zakaria also penned a bi-weekly column for the Times of India newspaper.

Personal life
Zakaria was married twice. He was the father of four children by his two wives:

 Mansoor Zakaria and Tasneem Zakaria Mehta, the art historian who works with INTACH in Mumbai, by his first wife, Shehnaz Khan, the daughter of a Bhopali aristocrat.
 Arshad Zakaria and Fareed Zakaria, the American journalist, by his second wife, Fatima Zakaria, who was for a time the editor of the Sunday Times of India and was in 2008 the editor of the Taj magazine of the Taj Hotels.

See also
 Syed Akbaruddin

References

External links

1920 births
2005 deaths
Indian diplomats
20th-century Muslim scholars of Islam
University of Mumbai alumni
Alumni of SOAS University of London
People from Aurangabad, Maharashtra
Rajya Sabha members from Maharashtra
Maharashtra MLAs 1962–1967
Founders of Indian schools and colleges
English-language writers from India
Urdu-language writers from India
Indian male journalists
20th-century Indian educational theorists
Writers from Mumbai
Indian Muslims
Konkani Muslims
People from Marathwada
Indian political writers
20th-century Indian journalists
Journalists from Maharashtra